Miska may refer to:

People
 Miska III Atyusz, Hungarian noble
 Brad Miska, American film producer
 Pali Miska, Albanian politician
 Miska Humaloja, Finnish ice hockey player
 Miska Magyarics, Hungarian Slovene poet
 Miska Petersham, American writer
 Miska Siikonen, Finnish ice hockey player

Other
 Miska, Tulkarm, a depopulated Palestinian village
 Miska the Magnate, a 1916 Hungarian film
 Miska the Wolf-Spider, a Dungeons & Dragons demon lord